The Soldier (also released as Codename: The Soldier) is a 1982 American Cold War action-thriller film written, directed, and produced by James Glickenhaus The film stars Ken Wahl, Alberta Watson, William Prince, Joaquim de Almeida, and Klaus Kinski, that featured a cameo by rising country superstar George Strait. The film was shot on location in Philadelphia, Buffalo and New York City, New York, West Berlin, and Israel. The ski sequence was filmed in St Anton am Arlberg in Austria. The original score was composed and performed by the German electronic band Tangerine Dream.

Plot
Renegade KGB agents, headed by Ivan, hijack a plutonium shipment inside the United States and use it to plant a nuclear device in the Saudi Arabian Ghawar Oil Field. They threaten to detonate it, thereby contaminating 50% of the world's oil reserve, unless Israel withdraws its settlements from the West Bank. In Washington, the American President contemplates starting a war with Israel, in order to save the world from a potential oil crisis. Washington is unaware that the KGB are behind this threat. The President orders the head of the CIA to find out who has planted the bomb and to do anything he can to stop this. The Soldier is then activated.

An elite CIA agent codenamed 'The Soldier' (Ken Wahl), working outside the usual channels, is assigned to the case. After Russian agent Dracha attempts to terminate him in the Austrian Alps, he contacts the CIA director from the US embassy in West Berlin. A KGB agent assassinates the director and frames The Soldier for his murder, leaving no official knowledge of his activities other than the president, who has disavowed any knowledge of his actions. On the run from his own government, he seeks refuge in the Israeli embassy. He and his team cooperate with the Israeli Mossad, represented by their director of covert operations Susan Goodman. Meanwhile, the president authorizes military action against Israel.

Given the unpleasant options of the KGB destroying a large part of the world's oil supply or the United States having to invoke a military response to force Israel to remove its settlements from the West Bank, the Soldier decides to take a third option. His team infiltrates and captures a US nuclear missile silo in Smith Center, Kansas, and obtains independent launch capability. As the American military launches their air strikes toward Israel, The Soldier and Susan break into East Berlin by launching their Porsche over the Berlin Wall, confronting the KGB agents and informing them that if their nuke in Saudi Arabia is detonated, his team in Smith Center will nuke Moscow. This forces the Russian KGB to dismantle their device in Saudi Arabia and the American air strike is recalled.

Cast
Ken Wahl as The Soldier, CIA Special Activities Division Operative
Alberta Watson as Susan Goodman, Israeli Mossad Director of Special Operations
William Prince as The President
Jeremiah Sullivan as Ivan, rogue Soviet KGB Agent
Joaquim de Almeida as Unus,  CIA Special Activities Division Operative
Peter Hooten as Duo, CIA Special Activities Division Operative
Steve James as Tribus, CIA Special Activities Division Operative
Alexander Spencer as Quartus, CIA Special Activities Division Operative
Klaus Kinski as Dracha, rogue Soviet KGB Agent
Al Israel as Keene
Ned Eisenberg as Hirsch
Martin Höner as Michael
Jeffrey Jones as US Assistant Secretary of Defense
Željko Ivanek as rouge KGB Agent Bomb maker/Cleaning Lady
Ron Harper as Head of CIA
Reuben Singer as Israeli Prime Minister

George Strait has a cameo appearance as himself, performing the song "Fool-Hearted Memory".

According to an interview with director James Glickenhaus, the scene with Klaus Kinski was added when the production was under budget and they were able to get Kinski for one day.

Soundtrack

The film's soundtrack was performed and recorded by Tangerine Dream. All tracks were composed by Edgar Froese, Chris Franke, and Johannes Schmoelling. The soundtrack was released as part of the box set Pilots of Purple Twilight (The Virgin Recordings 1980-1983) (2020). "The Soldier: Opening Theme" was released on the bootleg '70/90 (1990). "Soldier on the Beach" was released on the fan release Tangerine Tree Volume 50: Assorted Secrets 2 (2004).

References

External links
 
 
 

1982 films
1982 action thriller films
1980s spy films
American spy films
American action thriller films
Cold War spy films
Embassy Pictures films
Films about terrorism
Films about the Central Intelligence Agency
Films directed by James Glickenhaus
Films scored by Tangerine Dream
Films set in Austria
Films set in Berlin
Films set in East Germany
Films set in Jerusalem
Films set in Kansas
Films set in Minsk
Films set in Ontario
Films set in Paris
Films set in Philadelphia
Films set in Saudi Arabia
Films set in Tel Aviv
Films set in West Germany
Techno-thriller films
1980s English-language films
1980s American films